The 2017 Scottish League Cup final was the 72nd final of the Scottish League Cup and took place on 26 November 2017 at Hampden Park, Glasgow. The clubs contesting the final were Motherwell and Celtic. Celtic won the match 2–0, winning their 17th League Cup title.

Route to the final

Motherwell

Motherwell won Group F to qualify for the second round, winning all four games against Queen's Park, Greenock Morton, Edinburgh City and Berwick Rangers. 

Motherwell were seeded for the second round draw and were drawn to face Group D runners-up Ross County away from home on 9 August. The Steelmen required extra time to see off a spirited home side, with Ross MacLean scoring the decisive goal eight minutes from the final whistle

Stephen Robinson's faced Aberdeen at Fir Park in the quarter-finals on 21 September. A Peter Hartley header, bookended by a Louis Moult double, secured Motherwell's place in the semi-finals.

Rangers provided the opposition at Hampden Park on 22 October. In a match filled with controversial refereeing decisions, another brace from Louis Moult sent Motherwell to the final.

Celtic

As Celtic participated in European competition, they received a bye through the 2017–18 Scottish League Cup group stage. The holders were seeded for the second round draw and were drawn at home to face Group E runners-up Kilmarnock on 8 August. A brace from Leigh Griffiths and goals from Anthony Ralston, Kieran Tierney and Stuart Armstrong secured a 5–0 victory.

Celtic visited Dundee in the quarter-finals on 20 September. The Dark Blues were unable to contain Brendan Rodgers' side, with James Forrest, Scott Sinclair and Callum McGregor all on the scoresheet in a 4–0 win.

Celtic faced Hibernian in the semi-final at Hampden Park on 21 October. Two goals each from Mikael Lustig and Moussa Dembélé booked Celtic's place in the 2017 final, presenting the Bhoys with the opportunity to defend the trophy.

Match

Summary
Following a goalless first half, James Forrest gave Celtic the lead four minutes after the interval, controlling a Callum McGregor pass before curling the ball with his left foot into the far left corner of the net. On the hour mark, Craig Thomson awarded the Glasgow side a controversial penalty after Cédric Kipré was adjudged to have fouled Scott Sinclair.	
The French defender was red-carded and compatriot Moussa Dembélé converted the resultant penalty, shooting low to the centre of the net to secure back-to-back League Cup triumphs for the Scottish champions.

Details

See also
Played between same teams:
2018 Scottish Cup Final

References

External links

2017
2
Motherwell F.C. matches
Celtic F.C. matches
2010s in Glasgow
Sports competitions in Glasgow
November 2017 sports events in the United Kingdom
League Cup final